Craig Priestly is an Australian rugby league footballer who represented United States in the 2013 Rugby League World Cup.

Background
Priestly was born in Sydney, New South Wales, Australia.

Playing career
Priestly played 46 games for the Redcliffe Dolphins in the Queensland Cup. He currently plays for the Southampton Dragons in the AMNRL.

In 2013, Priestly was named in the United States squad for the World Cup.

External links
 http://www.redcliffedolphins.com.au/index.php?id=1246

References

1987 births
Living people
Australian rugby league players
Redcliffe Dolphins players
Rugby league halfbacks
Rugby league hookers
Rugby league players from Sydney
Southampton Dragons coaches
Southampton Dragons players
United States national rugby league team players